Hpala may refer to:
Hpala, Chipwi, Kachin State, Myanmar
Hpala, Hsawlaw, Kachin State, Myanmar